The 1995 Manitoba general election was held on April 25, 1995 to elect Members of the Legislative Assembly of the Province of Manitoba, Canada. It was won by the Progressive Conservative Party, which won 31 seats out of 57.  The New Democratic Party formed the official opposition with 23 seats; the Liberal Party won 3.

Results

1 "Before" refers to standings in the Legislature at dissolution, and not to the results of the previous election. These numbers therefore reflect changes in party standings as a result of by-elections and members crossing the floor.

Riding results
Results from Elections Manitoba

|-
| style="background:whitesmoke;"|Arthur-Virden
||
|Jim Downey5,015
|
|Ray Cantelo1,519
|
|Murray Lee1,258
|
|
||
|Jim Downey
|-
| style="background:whitesmoke;"|Assiniboia
||
|Linda McIntosh4,315
|
|Jo-Anne Swayze1,648
|
|Allen Green2,185
|
|
||
|Linda McIntosh
|-
| style="background:whitesmoke;"|Brandon East
|
|Greg Dinsdale2,608
||
|Len Evans4,395
|
|Elizabeth Roberts1,169
|
|
||
|Len Evans
|-
| style="background:whitesmoke;"|Brandon West
||
|James McCrae4,471
|
|Derry Decter2,790
|
|Mark Barber1,789
|
|
||
|James McCrae
|-
| style="background:whitesmoke;"|Broadway
|
|Ba Van Nguyen1,529
||
|Conrad Santos3,126
|
|Fred De Villa1,613
|
|Una Truscott (FPP)262
||
|Conrad Santos
|-
| style="background:whitesmoke;"|Burrows
|
|Bill McGee1,266
||
|Doug Martindale4,748
|
|Naty Yankech1,024
|
|
||
|Doug Martindale
|-
| style="background:whitesmoke;"|Charleswood
||
|Jim Ernst5,737
|
|Dale Walker1,197
|
|Gail Watson2,958
|
|
||
|Jim Ernst
|-
| style="background:whitesmoke;"|Concordia
|
|Paul Murphy1,845
||
|Gary Doer4,827
|
|Bret Dobbin816
|
|Guy Beaudry (Lbt)104
||
|Gary Doer
|-
| style="background:whitesmoke;"|Crescentwood
|
|Debbie Vivian3,455
||
|Tim Sale3,733
|
|Avis Gray3,170
|
|
||
|Avis Gray
|-
| style="background:whitesmoke;"|Dauphin
|
|Gord Ryz3,880
||
|Stan Struthers4,673
|
|Ranjit Sarin996
|
|Carey Contois (INV)111
||
|John Plohman
|-
| style="background:whitesmoke;"|Elmwood
|
|Clayton McMurren2,552
||
|Jim Maloway4264
|
|John Petryshyn1,227
|
|
||
|Jim Maloway
|-
| style="background:whitesmoke;"|Emerson
||
|Jack Penner4,965
|
|Georgine Spooner945
|
|Lorne Hamblin1,983
|
|
||
|Jack Penner
|-
| style="background:whitesmoke;"|Flin Flon
|
|Scott Merrell2,017
||
|Gerard Jennissen2,732
|
|Florence Allen500
|
|
||
|vacant
|-
| style="background:whitesmoke;"|Fort Garry
||
|Rosemary Vodrey5,959
|
|Brock Holowachuk1,857
|
|Jim Woodman4,434
|
|Alexander Pressey (Lbt)91
||
|Rosemary Vodrey
|-
| style="background:whitesmoke;"|Gimli
||
|Ed Helwer5,591
|
|Fran Frederickson3,746
|
|Don Forfar1,702
|
|
||
|Ed Helwer
|-
| style="background:whitesmoke;"|Gladstone
||
|Denis Rocan4,629
|
|Joyce Penner1,347
|
|Eric Ezikot1,454
|
|
||
|Denis Rocan
|-
| style="background:whitesmoke;"|Inkster
|
|Scott Fielding1,384
|
|Poy Gomez2,649
||
|Kevin Lamoureux4,394
|
|Scott Kowall (Ind)223
||
|Kevin Lamoureux
|-
| style="background:whitesmoke;"|Interlake
|
|Ed Trachuk2,562
||
|Clif Evans3,791
|
|Duncan Geisler766
|
|Darryl Sutherland (INV)289
||
|Clif Evans
|-
| style="background:whitesmoke;"|Kildonan
|
|Robert Praznik3,324
||
|Dave Chomiak5,812
|
|Joe Gallagher2,041
|
|
||
|Dave Chomiak
|-
| style="background:whitesmoke;"|Kirkfield Park
||
|Eric Stefanson5,949
|
|Darryl Livingstone1,325
|
|Vic Wieler2,616
|
|
||
|Eric Stefanson
|-
| style="background:whitesmoke;"|Lac du Bonnet
||
|Darren Praznik5,986
|
|Marguerite Ogilvie3,463
|
|Bill Flett1,039
|
|
||
|Darren Praznik
|-
| style="background:whitesmoke;"|Lakeside
||
|Harry Enns4,376
|
|Eduard Hiebert1,802
|
|Dorothy Hudson1,373
|
|Gary Bergen (Lbt)110
||
|Harry Enns
|-
| style="background:whitesmoke;"|
La Verendrye
||
|Ben Sveinson4,581
|
|Ronald Fiola2,452
|
|Marinus Van Osch2,507
|
|
||
|Ben Sveinson
|-
| style="background:whitesmoke;"|Minnedosa
||
|Harold Gilleshammer4,498
|
|J. D. Anderson2,041
|
|Elaine Shuttleworth1,702
|
|
||
|Harold Gilleshammer
|-
| style="background:whitesmoke;"|Morris
||
|Frank Pitura5,662
|
|Glen Hallick1,158
|
|Bill Roth2,329
|
|Dennis Rice (Lbt)135
||
|Clayton Manness
|-
| style="background:whitesmoke;"|Niakwa
||
|Jack Reimer5,908
|
|Leslie Fingler1,961
|
|Evelyne Reese3,748
|
|
||
|Jack Reimer
|-
| style="background:whitesmoke;"|Osborne
|
|Shelley Mitchell2,766
||
|Diane McGifford3,969
|
|Norma McCormick2,978
|
|
||
|Norma McCormick
|-
| style="background:whitesmoke;"|Pembina
||
|Peter Dyck5,092
|
|Sean Espey452
|
|Walter Hoeppner2,632
|
|
||
|Donald Orchard
|-
| style="background:whitesmoke;"|Point Douglas
|
|Claire Riddle578
||
|George Hickes3,095
|
|Linda Cantiveros1,132
|
|Lyle Morrisseau (FPP)105
||
|George Hickes
|-
| style="background:whitesmoke;"|Portage la Prairie
||
|Brian Pallister3,977
|
|Connie Gretsinger1,519
|
|Bob Turner2,117
|
|Ralph Jackson (Ind)130
||
|Brian Pallister
|-
| style="background:whitesmoke;"|Radisson
|
|Jennifer Clark2,107
||
|Marianne Cerilli4,891
|
|Art Miki2,401
|
|
||
|Marianne Cerilli
|-
| style="background:whitesmoke;"|Riel
||
|David Newman3,561
|
|Bob Herzog2,653
|
|Gord Steeves3,120
|
|
||
|Gerry Ducharme
|-
| style="background:whitesmoke;"|River East
||
|Bonnie Mitchelson4,938
|
|Karen Botting3,176
|
|Chris Walby2,347
|
|
||
|Bonnie Mitchelson
|-
| style="background:whitesmoke;"|River Heights
||
|Mike Radcliffe5,429
|
|Graham Dowdell1,352
|
|Anita Neville4,435
|
|Clancy Smith (Lbt)98
||
|vacant
|-
| style="background:whitesmoke;"|Roblin-Russell
||
|Len Derkach4,672
|
|Fred Embryk2,688
|
|Neil Stewart1,239
|
|
||
|Len Derkach
|-
| style="background:whitesmoke;"|Rossmere
||
|Vic Toews4,318
|
|Harry Schellenberg4,201
|
|Cecilia Connelly875
|
|
||
|Harry Schellenberg
|-
| style="background:whitesmoke;"|Rupertsland
|
|Eric Kennedy619
||
|Eric Robinson2,249
|
|Harry Wood1,018
|
|Jerry Fontaine (FPP)541
||
|Eric Robinson
|-
| style="background:whitesmoke;"|St. Boniface
|
|Kim Sigurdson1,686
|
|Rachel Massicotte2,829
||
|Neil Gaudry4,021
|
|Ivan Lecuyer306
||
|Neil Gaudry
|-
| style="background:whitesmoke;"|St. James
|
|Cliff Allbutt2,601
||
|MaryAnn Mihychuk3,019
|
|Paul Edwards2,853
|
|
||
|Paul Edwards
|-
| style="background:whitesmoke;"|St. Johns
|
|Marni Larkin1,587
||
|Gord Mackintosh4,513
|
|Bron Gorski1,610
|
|
||
|Gord Mackintosh
|-
| style="background:whitesmoke;"|St. Norbert
||
|Marcel Laurendeau4,699
|
|Pat Peters1,833
|
|Val Thompson4,172
|
|
||
|Marcel Laurendeau
|-
| style="background:whitesmoke;"|St. Vital
||
|Shirley Render4,021
|
|Sig Laser3,357
|
|Tim Ryan2,319
|
|
||
|Shirley Render
|-
| style="background:whitesmoke;"|Ste. Rose
||
|Glen Cummings3,762
|
|John Morrisseau2,341
|
|David Martin1,133
|
|
||
|Glen Cummings
|-
| style="background:whitesmoke;"|Seine River
||
|Louise Dacquay6,462
|
|Wilson Ho2,163
|
|Bobbi Éthier4,376
|
|
||
|Louise Dacquay
|-
| style="background:whitesmoke;"|Selkirk
|
|Brian Ketcheson3,839
||
|Greg Dewar4,758
|
|Elmer Keryluk2,273
|
|
||
|Greg Dewar
|-
| style="background:whitesmoke;"|Springfield
||
|Glen Findlay6,355
|
|Steve Pochuk4,275
|
|Bob Singh1,461
|
|Francis Trueman (Lbt)96
||
|Glen Findlay
|-
| style="background:whitesmoke;"|Steinbach
||
|Albert Driedger5,975
|
|Peter Hiebert787
|
|Cornelius Goertzen1,206
|
|
||
|Albert Driedger
|-
| style="background:whitesmoke;"|Sturgeon Creek
||
|Gerry McAlpine4,747
|
|Tamsin Collings1,688
|
|Bob Douglas3,051 
|
|Richard McIntyre (Ind)180
||
|Gerry McAlpine
|-
| style="background:whitesmoke;"|Swan River
|
|Fred Betcher3,985
||
|Rosann Wowchuk4,021
|
|David Gray559
|
|Nelson Contois (INV)118
||
|Rosann Wowchuk
|-
| style="background:whitesmoke;"|The Maples
|
|Fred Arrojado1,960
|
|Inderjit Claire2,634
||
|Gary Kowalski4,254
|
|
||
|Gary Kowalski
|-
| style="background:whitesmoke;"|The Pas
|
|Alfred McDonald2,501
||
|Oscar Lathlin3,616
|
|Clem Jones877
|
|
||
|Oscar Lathlin
|-
| style="background:whitesmoke;"|Thompson
|
|Chuck Shabe1,320
||
|Steve Ashton3,619
|
|Tim Johnston926
|
|
||
|Steve Ashton
|-
| style="background:whitesmoke;"|Transcona
|
|Richard Bueckert2,372
||
|Daryl Reid5,163
|
|Ingrid Pokrant1,216
|
|Jack Lang (Ind)131
||
|Daryl Reid
|-
| style="background:whitesmoke;"|Turtle Mountain
||
|Merv Tweed4,781
|
|Robert Smith1,334
|
|Doug Collins1,735
|
|
||
|Bob Rose
|-
| style="background:whitesmoke;"|Tuxedo
||
|Gary Filmon8,691
|
|Martha Owen1,457
|
|Rick Rosenberg2,975
|
|
||
|Gary Filmon
|-
| style="background:whitesmoke;"|Wellington
|
|Steve Place1,226
||
|Becky Barrett3,788
|
|Osmond Theodore Anderson1,996
|
|
||
|Becky Barrett
|-
| style="background:whitesmoke;"|Wolseley
|
|David Kovnats1,555
||
|Jean Friesen4,048
|
|Marilyn MacKinnon1,577
|
|
||
|Jean Friesen
|}

Post-election changes

|-
| style="background:whitesmoke;"|Portage la PrairieSeptember 30, 1997
||
|David Faurschou2,422
|
|Connie Gretsinger1,340
|
|Dave Quinn1,657
|
|Warren Goodwin (Ind)1,025Ralph Jackson (Ind)49
||
|Brian Pallister
|-
| style="background:whitesmoke;"|CharleswoodApril 28, 1998
||
|Myrna Driedger2,767
|
|Barrie Farrow961
|
|Alan McKenzie1,524
|
|
||
|Jim Ernst
|}

Gary Kowalski left the Liberal caucus on June 5, 1997, and Kevin Lamoureux followed suit on October 1, 1997.  Both rejoined the party caucus in 1998.

Neil Gaudry died on February 18, 1999.

See also
 List of Manitoba political parties
 Independent candidates, 1995 Manitoba provincial election

References

1995
1995 elections in Canada
1995 in Manitoba
April 1995 events in Canada